Tom Devriendt (born 29 October 1991) is a Belgian professional racing cyclist, who currently rides for UCI ProTeam .

Major results

2011
 1st Dwars door de Antwerpse Kempen
2013
 3rd Grote Prijs Stad Geel
2014
 3rd Omloop van het Waasland
2015
 3rd Grand Prix Pino Cerami
2016
 6th Eschborn-Frankfurt
 8th Overall Tour de Picardie
2017
 1st Omloop van het Houtland
 3rd Binche–Chimay–Binche
 7th Paris–Bourges
2018
 7th Great War Remembrance Race
2019
 1st Stage 2 Tour of Austria
 5th Grote Prijs Stad Zottegem
2021
 4th Grote Prijs Jef Scherens
 8th Trofeo Alcudia – Port d'Alcudia
2022
 4th Paris–Roubaix
 6th Schaal Sels
 7th Dwars door het Hageland

References

External links
 

1991 births
Living people
Belgian male cyclists
People from Veurne
Cyclists from West Flanders
21st-century Belgian people